Keuka Lake State Park is a  state park located in Yates County, New York. The park is located on the north end of the west branch of Keuka Lake, one of the Finger Lakes. The park is in the southeast part of the town of Jerusalem, southeast of Branchport.

Description
Keuka Lake State Park offers picnic tables with pavilions, a playground, hiking, hunting and fishing, cross-country skiing and snowmobiling, a boat launch, and a campground with tent and trailer sites.

Located within the park is the Beddoe–Rose Family Cemetery, listed on the National Register of Historic Places in 2014. Road access to the park are closed during peak season in the summer, but re-opened during the off-season to limit car traffic.

See also
 List of New York state parks

References

External links
 New York State Parks: Keuka Lake State Park

State parks of New York (state)
Parks in Yates County, New York